Shah Nawaz Khan is a town and union council of Depalpur Tehsil in the Okara District of Punjab Province, Pakistan. It is lies to the south of the district capital Okara and south-west of the tehsil capital Depalpur at 30°33'0N 73°32'60E.

References

Union councils of Okara District